In Luxembourg, the standard time is Central European Time (CET; UTC+01:00). Daylight saving time is observed from the last Sunday in March (02:00 CET) to the last Sunday in October (03:00 CEST).

History 
Luxembourg first introduced CET in 1904, but switched to UTC+00:00 in 1918. CET was reintroduced in 1940 under German occupation.

IANA time zone database 
In the IANA time zone database, Luxembourg is given one zone in the file zone.tab – Europe/Luxembourg. Data for Luxembourg directly from zone.tab of the IANA time zone database; columns marked with * are the columns from zone.tab itself:

See also 
Time in Europe
List of time zones by country
List of time zones by UTC offset

References

External links 
Current time in Luxembourg at Time.is